Miss Universe 1988, the 37th Miss Universe pageant, was held on 24 May 1988 sponsored by Formosa Airlines at the Lin Kou Stadium in Taipei, Taiwan. Cecilia Bolocco of Chile crowned Porntip Nakhirunkanok of Thailand at the end of the event. 66 candidates competed in this year's edition.

Results

Placements

Final Competition

Contestants

  - Claudia Gabriela Pereyra
  - Vanessa Lynn Gibson
  - Maria Steinhart
  - Natasha Christine Pinder
  - Daisy Van Cauwenbergh
  - Kim Lightbourne
  - Ana María Pereyra Parada
  - Isabel Beduschi
  - Nelda Felecia Farrington
  - Melinda Gillies
  - Verónica Romero Carvajal
  - Diana Patricia Arévalo Guerra
  - Erika Maria Paoli
  - Pernille Nathansen
  - Patricia Jimenez
  - Cecilia Pozo Caminer
  - Amina Sammy Shelbaya
  - Ana Margarita Vaquerano Celarie
  - Tracey Williams
  - Nina Carita Björnström
  - Claudia Frittolini
  - Christiane Kopp
  - Mayte Sanchez
  - Nuno Nette Baadh
  - Liza Maria Camacho
  - Silvia Mansilla
  - Annabet Reindina Berendsen
  - Jacqueline Herrera Mejia
  - Pauline Yeung
  - Anna Margret Jonsdóttir
  - Adrienne Rock †
  - Shirly Ben Mordechai
  - Simona Ventura
  - Leota Suah 
  - Mizuho Sakaguchi
  - Jang Yoon-jeong
  - Elaine Georges Fakhoury
  - Lydie Garnie
  - Linda Lum
  - Stephanie Spiteri
  - Amanda Olivares
  - Lana Coc-Kroft
  - Omasan Tokurbo Buwa
  - Ruby Jean Hamilton
  - Bente Brunland
  - Marta Noemi Acosta Granada
  - Katia Mirella Escudero Lozano
  - Perfida Reyes Limpin
  - Isabel Martins da Costa
  - Isabel Maria Pardo
  - Jade Hu Fei-Tsui
  - Amanda Laird
  - Audrey Ann Tay
  - Sonsoles Artigas Medero
  - Deepthi Alles
  - Annika Davidsson
  - Gabriela Bigler
  - Porntip Nakhirunkanok
  - Cheryl Ann Gordon
  - Meltem Hakarar
  - Edna Elizabeth Smith
  - Carla Irene Trombotti Moreno
  - Courtney Gibbs
  - Heather Carty
  - Yajaira Cristina Vera Roldán
  - Lise Marie Williams

Notes

Returns

Last competed in 1964:
 
Last competed in 1985:
 

Last competed in 1986:

Withdrawals

Replacement
  - Sylvie Bertin refused to compete in both Miss Universe and Miss World pageants. The pageant organizers decided to send her first runner-up, Claudia Frittolini to compete in both pageants instead.

Awards
  - Miss Amity (Liza Maria Camacho)
  - Miss Photogenic (Tracey Williams)
  - Best National Costume (Porntip Nakhirunkanok)

Host city
Was expected that Helsinki in Finland was the host city after Bob Barker announced at the end of 1987 pageant he would act on this function. However on January 3, 1988, the mayor of Helsinki, Raimo Ilaskivi, announced that the city has withdrawn to host the pageant due to logistical and financial problems. The next day, it was officially announced that the contest was being moved to Taipei.

General references

References

External links
 Miss Universe official website

1988
1988 in Taiwan
1988 beauty pageants
Beauty pageants in Taiwan
Events in Taipei
May 1988 events in Asia